The Provincial Council of North Brabant, also known as the States of North Brabant, is the provincial council of North Brabant, Netherlands. It forms the legislative body of the province. Its 55 seats are distributed every four years in provincial elections.

Current composition
Since the 2019 provincial elections, the distribution of seats of the Provincial Council of North Brabant has been as follows:

However since then 3 members of FvD went to the new party Ja21 instead.

See also
 States of Brabant
 Provincial politics in the Netherlands

References

External links
  

Politics of North Brabant
History of North Brabant
North Brabant